Biharsharif Assembly constituency is one of 243 constituencies of legislative assembly of Bihar.  It is a part of Nalanda Lok Sabha constituency along with other assembly constituencies viz. Islampur, Harnaut, Hilsa, Nalanda, Asthawan and Rajgir.  In 2015 Bihar Legislative Assembly election, Biharsharif will be one of the 36 seats to have VVPAT enabled electronic voting machines.

Overview
Biharsharif comprises CD Block Rahui & Bihar (M).

Members of Legislative Assembly

Election results

2020

2015

References

External links
 

Politics of Nalanda district
Assembly constituencies of Bihar